Ghettos were established by Nazi Germany in hundreds of locations across occupied Poland after the German invasion of Poland. Most ghettos were established between October 1939 and July 1942 in order to confine and segregate Poland's Jewish population of about 3.5 million for the purpose of persecution, terror, and exploitation. In smaller towns, ghettos often served as staging points for Jewish  and mass deportation actions, while in the urban centers they resembled walled-off prison-islands described by some historians as little more than instruments of "slow, passive murder", with dead bodies littering the streets.

In most cases, the larger ghettos did not correspond to traditional Jewish neighborhoods, and non-Jewish Poles and members of other ethnic groups were ordered to take up residence elsewhere. Smaller Jewish communities with populations under 500 were terminated through expulsion soon after the invasion.

The Holocaust

The liquidation of the Jewish ghettos across occupied Poland was closely connected with the construction of secretive death camps—industrial-scale mass-extermination facilities—built in early 1942 for the sole purpose of murder. The Nazi extermination program depended on rail transport, which enabled the SS to run  and, at the same time, openly lie to their victims about the "resettlement program". Jews were transported to their deaths in Holocaust trains from liquidated ghettos of all occupied cities, including Łódź Ghetto, the last in Poland to be liquidated in August 1944. In some larger ghettos there were armed resistance attempts, such as the Warsaw Ghetto Uprising, the Białystok Ghetto Uprising, the Będzin and the Łachwa Ghetto uprisings, but in every case they failed against the overwhelming German military force, and the resisting Jews were either executed locally or deported with the rest of prisoners to the extermination camps. By the time Nazi-occupied Eastern Europe was liberated by the Red Army, not a single Jewish ghetto in Poland was left standing. Only about 50,000–120,000 Polish Jews survived the war on native soil, a fraction of their prewar population of 3,500,000.

In total, according to archives of the United States Holocaust Memorial Museum, "The Germans established at least 1000 ghettos in German-occupied and annexed Poland and the Soviet Union alone." The list of locations of the Jewish ghettos within the borders of pre-war and post-war Poland is compiled with the understanding that their inhabitants were either of Polish nationality from before the invasion, or had strong historical ties with Poland. Also, not all ghettos are listed here due to their transient nature. Permanent ghettos were created only in settlements with rail connections, because the food aid (paid by the Jews themselves) was completely dependent on the Germans, making even the potato-peels a hot commodity. Throughout 1940 and 1941, most ghettos were sealed off from the outside, walled off or enclosed with barbed wire, and any Jews found outside them could be shot on sight. The Łódź Ghetto was the second largest, holding about 160,000 inmates. In documents and signage, the Nazis usually referred to the ghettos they created as Jüdischer Wohnbezirk or Wohngebiet der Juden, meaning "Jewish Quarter". By the end of 1941, most Polish Jews were already ghettoized, even though the Germans knew that the system was unsustainable; most inmates had no chance of earning their own keep, and no savings left to pay the SS for further deliveries. The quagmire was resolved at the Wannsee conference of 20 January 1942 near Berlin, where the "Final Solution" (die Endlösung der Judenfrage) was set in place.

List of Jewish ghettos in occupied Poland
The settlements listed in the Polish language, including major cities, had all been renamed after the 1939 joint invasion of Poland by Germany and the Soviet Union. Renaming everything in their own image had been one way in which the invaders sought to redraw Europe's political map. All Polish territories were assigned as either Nazi zones of occupation (i.e. Bezirk Bialystok, Provinz Ostpreußen, etc.), or annexed by the Soviet Union, soon to be overrun again in Operation Barbarossa. The Soviet Ukraine and Byelorussia witnessed the "Polish Operation" of the NKVD, resulting in the virtual absence of ethnic Poles in the USSR along the pre-war border with Poland since the Great Purge.

Aftermath

The ghetto inhabitants – most of whom were murdered during Operation Reinhard – possessed Polish citizenship before the Nazi–Soviet invasion of Poland, which in turn enabled over 150,000 Holocaust survivors registered at CKŻP to take advantage of the later repatriation agreements between the governments of Poland and the Soviet Union, and legally emigrate to the West to help form the nascent State of Israel. Poland was the only Eastern Bloc country to allow free Jewish aliyah without visas or exit permits upon the conclusion of World War II. By contrast, Stalin forcibly brought Soviet Jews back to USSR along with all Soviet citizens, as agreed to in the Yalta Conference.

Some Jewish populations remained in the ghettos after their destruction. Many Jewish people were not able to leave the ghettos, either because they were too destitute or because they were still surrounded by Germans. This resulted in many of the ghettos' inhabitants dying from harsh conditions such as exposure, lack of food, and diseases. Those who left  faced the challenge of seeking a place where they as displaced people could be resettled.

See also
 Nazi ghettos
 Jewish ghettos in Europe
 Chronicles of Terror
 German camps in occupied Poland during World War II
 Nazi crimes against the Polish nation
 Timeline of Treblinka extermination camp

Notes and references

Holocaust locations in Poland